Cromidon is a genus of flowering plants belonging to the family Scrophulariaceae.

Its native range is Southern Africa.

Species:

Cromidon austerum 
Cromidon confusum 
Cromidon corrigioloides 
Cromidon decumbens 
Cromidon dregei 
Cromidon gracile 
Cromidon hamulosum 
Cromidon microechinos 
Cromidon minutum 
Cromidon plantaginis 
Cromidon pusillum 
Cromidon varicalyx

References

Scrophulariaceae
Scrophulariaceae genera
Taxa named by Robert Harold Compton